The 1983 Winfield State League was the second season of the Queensland Rugby League's statewide competition. The competition was run similarly to the NSWRL's Amco Cup, featuring a short format prior the larger Brisbane Premiership season. Fortitude Valley won the title with a 21-12 win over Easts Tigers in the final at Lang Park in Brisbane.

Teams 
A total of 14 teams competed in the inaugural season, 8 of which were BRL Premiership clubs. The remaining six were regional teams from across the state, hence the State League name.

Ladder 
Easts and Valleys qualified for a one-off final from a 7-round season, while four teams, Norths, Souths, Central Queensland and Gold Coast each received a point for matches which did not take place as scheduled in round six. All 8 Brisbane clubs finished above their country counterparts on the ladder for the second year running.

Source:

Final 
The one-off final was held at held at QRL headquarters at Lang Park, between the defending champions Easts and Valleys. In the final, the Tigers could not repeat their success of 1982, beaten by the Diehards 21-12.

References

Rugby league in Brisbane
Winfield State League season